Dorset Mountain located in Vermont, on the border of Rutland and Bennington counties, is a mountain of the Taconic Range. The highest summit of Dorset Mountain is within the town of Danby.  An unmaintained hiking trail ascends Dorset Peak from the southwest.

Dorset Mountain was once the proposed site of a controversial alpine ski resort project in the 1960s.

Dorset Mountain is flanked to the south by Netop Mountain, Dorset Hill, and Mount Aeolus; to the west by The Scallop; to the northwest by Woodlawn Mountain; and to the southwest by Spruce Peak and The Gallop, subordinate peaks on the combined northern ridge of Bear Mountain and Mother Myrick Mountain. All of these mountains are of the Taconic Range. To the east, Dorset Mountain is flanked by Peru Peak and Styles Peak of the Green Mountains. The east face of Dorset Mtn. drains into the upper part of Otter Creek, thence into Lake Champlain, and ultimately into the Gulf of Saint Lawrence in Canada. The northern slopes of Dorset Mtn. drain into Mill Brook, thence into Otter Creek. The southwestern slopes drain into the Mettawee River, and thence into the south bay of Lake Champlain. The southeastern extension of Dorset's massif drains into Batten Kill, thence into the Hudson River, and into New York Harbor.

Danby marble
Dorset Mountain is home to the largest underground marble quarry in the world. The quarry is entered through the same opening that has been in use for over 100 years. The mine is 1 ½ miles deep, and this is where Danby marble is quarried. Vermont Quarries Corporation took over the production and operation of the famous Danby Marble quarry in 1992.

See also 
 List of mountains in Vermont
 New England Hundred Highest
 New England Fifty Finest

Notes

External links 
 
 Dorset Hollow Ski Area - New England's Cancelled Ski Areas.
  Dorset Mountain - NHMountainHiking.com.
 Vermont Quarries Corporation.

Mountains of Vermont
New England Hundred Highest
Taconic Mountains
Mountains of Bennington County, Vermont
Mountains of Rutland County, Vermont